Borivali–Surat MEMU is a DEMU train belonging to Western Railway zone that runs between  in Maharashtra and  of Gujarat . It is currently being operated with 69139//69140 train numbers on daily basis.

Route and halts

The important halts of the train are:

Average speed and frequency

69139/Borivali–Surat MEMU has average speed of 40 km/h and completes 234 km in 5 hour 50 minutes.
69140/Surat–Borivali MEMU has average speed of 52 km/h and completes 234 km in 2 hour 40 minutes. There are seven trains which run on a daily basis

Schedule

Traction 

DEMU: Rated power is 1600 HP and has 10 coaches with maximum speed is 130 kmph. Transmission is AC electric. Rakes are made at ICF coach.

Rake sharing

The rake is being shared with Surat–Bharuch MEMU and Virar–Bharuch MEMU.

See also 

 Surat–Bharuch MEMU 
 Virar–Bharuch MEMU

Notes

References

External links 

 69139/Borivali–Surat MEMU
 69140/Valsad–Virar MEMU

Transport in Mumbai
Transport in Surat
Rail transport in Maharashtra
Electric multiple units of India
Borivali
Electric multiple units in Gujarat